The League 1 Shield was a competition that is played at the end of the regular rugby league season in the League 1 Super 8s of the League 1 (rugby league).

Structure
The teams that do not qualify for the Super 8s in League 1 play each other once more, if there is an odd number of teams then each team takes a bye round. The top two teams play each other in the Shield Final at the home of the team finishing first.

League 1 Shield finals

Summary of winners

See also
Rugby League Super 8s
League 1 Super 8s
Championship Shield

References

External links

RFL League 1
2016 establishments in England